Aramango is a town and seat of Aramango District in Bagua Province in the Amazonas region of Peru.

External links
Satellite map at Maplandia.com
Location on MSN Encarta map

Populated places in the Amazonas Region